The City of Port Adelaide Enfield, located across inner north and north-western suburbs of Adelaide, is one of the largest metropolitan councils within South Australia. It was established on 26 March 1996 by the amalgamation of the City of Port Adelaide and the City of Enfield.

Extending from the River Torrens to Outer Harbor, and covering an area of approximately 97 km², the Port Adelaide Enfield contains some of the South Australia's finest historical buildings and landmarks. The Port Adelaide area is known as the History Precinct, as it is home to the Maritime Museum, the National Railway Museum and the Aviation Museum.

 the current Mayor is Claire Boan, who was elected in 2018. There are 17 ward councillors who represent the residents and businesses of their wards at council meetings.

Council

The current council  is:

History
The City of Port Adelaide Enfield was established on 26 March 1996 by the amalgamation of the City of Port Adelaide and the City of Enfield.

The council of Port Adelaide was established on 27 December 1855 when Port Adelaide was declared a Corporate Town centred at the port of Adelaide which had been opened some years prior in 1837. From 1884 to 1900 five adjacent district councils were amalgamated with the Corporate Town of Port Adelaide, dramatically increasing its size. In 1901 Port Adelaide was proclaimed a city by Governor Tennyson.

Centred around the township of Enfield, the District Council of Yatala south was formed in 1868 when the District Council of Yatala was divided in two. Dry Creek and the Dry Creek-Port Adelaide railway line formed the new council's northern boundary. In 1933, Yatala South was renamed to be Enfield Council. In 1944 Enfield District Council became a municipality and in 1953, thanks to the post-war boom in population, it was upgraded to city status.

Mayors
 Johannes Gerardus (Hans) Pieters (1996) 
 Michael (Mike) Charles Stock (1996–1997) 
 Johanna Maria Hendrika McLuskey (1997–2003)
 Fiona Barr (2003–2006)
 Gary Robert Johanson (2006–2018)
 Claire Boan (2018–present)

Suburbs

See also 
 Local Government Areas of South Australia
 City of Port Adelaide
 James Millner (doctor), early alderman of Port Adelaide Council
 City of Enfield
 List of Adelaide parks and gardens

References

Footnotes

External links 
 
 City of Port Adelaide Enfield community profile (I.D. Consulting Pty Ltd)
 Development Plan for Port Enfield area, September 2005 (Government of South Australia)

Port Adelaide Enfield
Port Adelaide Enfield